Ventspils Olympic Center Basketball Hall is a multi-purpose indoor sports arena that is located in Ventspils, Latvia. It is a part of the Ventspils Olympic Center, which also includes a 3,200 seat football stadium. The arena is mainly used to host basketball and volleyball games, boxing and wrestling matches, gymnastics, badminton and tennis matches, and martial arts sports. The arena has a seating capacity of 3,085 for basketball games.

Features
Ventspils Olympic Center features a fitness and weight training gym, a gymnastics training room, a sauna complex area, a physical therapy and medical office, a cafe, and a media press room.

History
Ventspils Olympic Center opened in 1997, and it has since been used as the home arena of the Latvian professional basketball club, BK Ventspils, of the Latvian Basketball League (LBL). The arena was used to host group stage games of the 2012 FIBA Europe Under-16 Championship, and the 2013 FIBA Europe Under-18 Championship.

See also
Ventspils Olympic Center Stadium
List of indoor arenas in Latvia

References

External links
Official site 
Official site 
Ventspils Olympic Center Basketball Hall at Ventspils.lv
Exterior Image of Ventspils Olympic Center Basketball Hall
Interior Image 1 of Ventspils Olympic Center Basketball Hall
Interior Image 2 of Ventspils Olympic Center Basketball Hall

Buildings and structures completed in 1997
Basketball venues in Latvia
Indoor arenas in Latvia